Flight 212 may refer to:
Air France Flight 212 (1968), crashed on 6 March 1968
Air France Flight 212 (1969), crashed on 3 December 1969
Eastern Air Lines Flight 212, crashed on 11 September 1974

212